Gonodera is a genus of beetles belonging to the family Tenebrionidae.

The species of this genus are found in Europe.

Species:
 Gonodera antiqua (Wickham, 1913)
 Gonodera baygushevae Nabozhenko & Chigray, 2018

References

Tenebrionidae